Substitute Wife (Finnish: Vaimoke) is a 1936 Finnish romantic comedy film directed by Valentin Vaala and starring Ansa Ikonen, Tauno Palo and Uuno Laakso.

Cast
 Ansa Ikonen as Kirsti Leivo / Latva  
 Tauno Palo as Esko Latva  
 Uuno Laakso as Julle  
 Kirsti Suonio as Sofia  
 Kunto Karapää as Tanu Miettinen  
 Sylvi Palo as Maija Pietarinen  
 Väinö Sola as Parish clerk  
 Ruth Snellman as Signe  
 Aino Lohikoski as Liisa  
 Sirpa Tolonen as Leena  
 Rakel Linnanheimo as Maila  
 Sointu Kouvo as Sirkka  
 Eino Jurkka as Torvela  
 Kaija Suonio as Dean's wife  
 Erwin Uimonen as Hoffman 
 Siiri Angerkoski as Mrs. Miettinen  
 Matti Aulos as Porter  
 Vilho Auvinen as Man in a train  
 Arvo Kuusla as Man in a club  
 Irja Kuusla as Maid 
 Kyösti Käyhkö as Man in a train  
 Liisa Nevalainen as Kirsti's guest  
 Otto Noro as Man in a train  
 Rosi Rinne as Housekeeper  
 Pentti Saares as Man in a phone booth  
 Margareta Wasenius as Kirsti's guest  
 Elli Ylimaa as Spinster

References

Bibliography 
 Pietari Kääpä. Directory of World Cinema: Finland. Intellect Books, 2012.

External links 
 

1936 films
1936 romantic comedy films
Finnish romantic comedy films
1930s Finnish-language films
Films directed by Valentin Vaala
Finnish black-and-white films